Lady Diana Beauclerk (née Lady Diana Spencer; other married name Diana St John, Viscountess Bolingbroke; 24 March 1734 – 1 August 1808) was an English noblewoman and artist.

Early life

Beauclerk was born into the Spencer family as the daughter of Charles Spencer, 3rd Duke of Marlborough (1706–1758), and the Honourable Elizabeth Trevor (d. 1761). Her siblings were George, Charles, and Elizabeth. Her great-grandmother was the formidable Sarah Churchill, Duchess of Marlborough. She was raised at Langley Park, Buckinghamshire, where she was introduced to art at an early age. Joshua Reynolds, an artist, was a family friend.

Marriages and children

On 8 September 1757, she married Frederick St John, 2nd Viscount Bolingbroke (1734–1787). From 1762 to 1768 she was Lady of the Bedchamber to Queen Charlotte. She became widely known as 'Lady Di' (as did her namesake, Diana, Princess of Wales, prior to her marriage).

Beauclerk had four children during this first marriage:
George St John, 3rd Viscount Bolingbroke (5 March 1761 – 11 December 1824)
Henriette St John (1 Aug 1762 - April 1834) - married in 1792 Henry Towcester
Anne (born ca. 1764, and did not survive infancy)
Frederick St John (British Army officer) (20 December 1765 — 19 November 1844)

Finding herself in a desperately unhappy marriage to the notoriously unfaithful Viscount Bolingbroke, Lady Di overturned convention. She left her husband and maintained a secret relationship with her lover, Topham Beauclerk. In February 1768 Bolingbroke petitioned for divorce on grounds of adultery ("criminal conversation"). The petition required an act of parliament, which was passed the next month.

Within two days, she married Topham Beauclerk of Old Windsor. They had three children: 
Elisabeth Beauclerk (20 August 1766 – 25 March 1793), married her cousin George Herbert, 11th Earl of Pembroke
(Anne) Mary Day Beauclerk (29 June or 20 August 1766 – 23 July 1851), twin of Elisabeth.  She famously had a long-term relationship with her own half-brother Bolingbroke, and had four sons by him.  After he abandoned her, she married in 1797 Franz von Jenison-Walworth (1764–1824), a German count of English parentage (son of Count Francis Jenison), and had legitimate issue 2 sons (one son deceased) and four daughters.  (Her descendants via her youngest daughter Emilie or Amalie include princes of Loewenstein-Wertheim-Freudenberg, and through them, other German royalty).
Charles George Beauclerk (20 January 1774 – 25 December 1846), M.P. for Richmond (1796-8), in 1799 he married Emily Charlotte Ogilvie, daughter of Emily Mary Lennox, Duchess of Leinster, by second husband, William Ogilvie.

Friends

Their circle of friends included Samuel Johnson, Georgiana Cavendish — who maintained a glittering salon — Edward Gibbon, David Garrick, Charles Fox, James Boswell and Edmund Burke.

Fanny Burney recorded in her diary the feelings of Edmund Burke about Lady Diana after the death of Topham Beauclerk: From the window of the dining-parlour, Sir Joshua [Reynolds] directed us to look at a pretty white house which belonged to Lady Di. Beauclerk.

"I am extremely glad," said Mr. Burke, "to see her at last so well housed; poor woman! the bowl has long rolled in misery; I rejoice that it has now found its balance. I never, myself, so much enjoyed the sight of happiness in another, as in that woman when I first saw her after the death of her husband. It was really enlivening to behold her placed in that sweet house, released from all her cares, a thousand pounds a year at her own disposal, and — her husband was dead! Oh, it was pleasant, it was delightful to see her enjoyment of her situation!"

"But, without considering the circumstances" said Mr. Gibbon, "this may appear very strange, though, when they are fairly stated, it is perfectly rational and unavoidable."
"Very true," said Mr. Burke, "if the circumstances are not considered, Lady Di. may seem highly reprehensible."

He then, addressing himself particularly to me, as the person least likely to be acquainted with the character of Mr. Beauclerk, drew it himself in strong and marked expressions, describing the misery he gave his wife, his singular ill-treatment of her, and the necessary relief the death of such a man must give. 

On the other hand, James Boswell records that Samuel Johnson said of her (in 1773), "The woman's a whore and there's an end on't."

Artistic work

Diana eventually helped to support herself by painting. She was a highly gifted artist who was able to use her scandalous reputation as an adulteress, aristocratic woman to further her career as a painter and designer. She painted portraits, illustrated plays and books, provided designs for Wedgwood's innovative pottery, and decorated rooms with murals. Championed by her close friend Horace Walpole, whose letters illuminate all aspects of her life, she was able to establish herself as an admired artist at a time when women struggled to forge careers.

Beauclerk illustrated a number of literary productions, including Horace Walpole's tragedy The Mysterious Mother, the English translation of Gottfried August Bürger's Leonora (1796) and The Fables of John Dryden (1797). After 1785 she was one of a circle of women, along with Emma Crewe and Elizabeth Templetown (1746/7-1823), whose designs for Josiah Wedgwood were made into bas-reliefs on jasper ornaments.

Sculpture design
Beauclerk designed the allegorical group, sculpted by John de Veere of the Coade Stone factory, to decorate the plain facade of the Pelican and British Empire Life Insurance Company at 70 Lombard Street in the City of London. It was rescued before building demolition in 1915 and is now displayed in the Horniman Museum.

Later life, death, and legacy
Beauclerk's second husband died in 1780 and, due to restricted finances, she began to lead a more retired life. She died in 1808 and was buried in Richmond.

In the mid-1990s a portrait of her hung in Kenwood House, on Hampstead Heath in London, with the caption: "Lady Diana Spencer, known chiefly for the unhappiness of her first marriage."

References

Surtees, Virginia. 'Beauclerk, Lady Diana (1734–1808).' in Oxford Dictionary of National Biography. Ed. H. C. G. Matthew and Brian Harrison. Oxford: OUP, 2004. 8 May 2007.

Further reading
Erskine, Beatrice. Lady Diana Beauclerk, her life and her work (London: T.F. Unwin, 1903).
Hicks, Carola. Improper Pursuits: The Scandalous Life of an Earlier Lady Diana Spencer (New York: St. Martin's Press, 2001).
 Editors Delia Gaze, Maja Mihajlovic, Leanda Shrimpton. Entry at Dictionary of Women Artists: Artists. Taylor & Francis, 1997. *Kim Sloan. A Noble Art: Amateur Artists and Drawing Masters, C.1600-1800'. British Museum Press, 2000.

External links

Lady Diana Beauclerk on Artnet (6 Dec 2010)
Three children, seated in a landscape, with a basket of wild flowers (Pencil & watercolour - Christie's)
British Museum collection of 73 works

Diana Beauclerk
1734 births
1808 deaths
English illustrators
English watercolourists
English women painters
Daughters of English dukes
Diana
Bolingbroke
People from Buckinghamshire
People from Old Windsor
Women watercolorists
18th-century English women
18th-century English people
19th-century English women
19th-century English people
British ladies-in-waiting
Wedgwood pottery
Court of George III of the United Kingdom
Household of Charlotte of Mecklenburg-Strelitz